State Route 45 (SR-45) is a state highway in the U.S. state of Utah. It runs from Dragon Road south of Bonanza in Uintah County north to US-40 in Naples, south of Vernal.

The route was added to the state highway system in 1925 and numbered in 1927, originally running from US-40 southeast to the Colorado state line. Subsequently, the highway was moved to a new road in 1943, truncated to Bonanza in 1968, and again moved and extended in 1982.

Route description
The route begins at the intersection of Dragon Road south of Bonanza as a two-lane undivided road. From there, it heads north-northwest and passes through Bonanza. Past the settlement, the route goes in a northwest direction for the rest of its path and enters in Naples as 1500 East, where it terminates at US-40.

History
The road now known as Snake John Reef Road, running southeast from SR-6 (US-40) to the state line, was added to the state highway system in 1925 and numbered SR-45 in 1927. Across the state line, this connected with the original alignment of State Highway 64. In 1943, the route was shifted west, now following Old Bonanza Highway from US-40 south to Bonanza. An extension south to the state line via Dragon was added in 1945, with an unnumbered unimproved road (briefly State Highway 395) continuing over Baxter Pass to US 50 near Mack, Colorado. The same year, State Route 207 was created as a short spur, now Bitter Creek Road, to Rainbow. The State Road Commission removed these 1945 additions from the state highway system in 1968, cutting SR-45 back to Bonanza.

The commission proposed in 1957, and the legislature approved in 1961, the creation of State Route 264 from the Red Wash Oil Field north to US-40 at Jensen. However, the road was given back to Uintah County in 1969. Subsequently, the county constructed and improved two roads, one running southeast from US-40 near Naples to former SR-264, and the other continuing from old SR-264 west of the oil field to SR-45. Both of these became part of SR-45 in 1982, when that route was moved farther west, keeping only a short piece of the 1943 alignment near Bonanza. It was simultaneously extended back south from Bonanza, across the White River, to its present terminus near the White River Mine (oil shale).

Major intersections

References

045
 045